Tracey K (born Tracey Kelliher) is an Irish singer and songwriter best known for providing the vocals and lyrics for the UK Dance Chart hit "The Cure and the Cause".

Career
Kelliher was raised in Kerry, in the south west of Ireland.

While in University in Galway, Kelliher joined Dextris, a group consisting of two vocalists harmonising over house and hip-hop beats. In 2003, Kelliher collaborated with Shane Johnson and Greg Dowling of Fish Go Deep. Their first track was "Lil' Hand" which was later released as the title track on their debut album. Their first single release was "Nights Like These", on the UK Inspirit Music label in 2003. In 2004, Lil' Hand was released on Canadian label, Ultrasound Recordings. The single was remixed by Dennis Ferrer in 2005 and reached No. 23 on the UK Singles Chart and No. 1 on the Dance chart. The song was released in the U.S. on Strictly Rhythm in 2007.

Discography

Albums

Singles

References

 Tracey K has come a long way from singing to her dad in Tralee (December 2004) The Kingdom Archives. Retrieved 16 July 2008.
 Interview with Lady Duracell ladyduracell.moonfruit.com. Retrieved 13 July 2008.
 Interview in RWD Magazine (August 2006). Retrieved 19 August 2008.

External links

Tracey K at ConnectedTalent.com

Alumni of the University of Galway
Irish women singer-songwriters
Musicians from County Kerry
Living people
People from Tralee
Year of birth missing (living people)
Irish electronic musicians
Irish dance musicians
Irish house musicians
20th-century Irish women singers
21st-century Irish women singers